Ormenoides venusta is a species of flatid planthopper in the family Flatidae, found in North America.

References

Flatidae
Insects described in 1902